Molendinar can refer to:

Molendinar, Queensland in Australia
Molendinar Burn in Glasgow